William Stewart (1769 – 8 April 1854) was a Scottish-born Australian administrator, politician and soldier.

He was born in Caithness to William Stewart. In 1794 he enlisted in the army, serving in the West Indies, Spain, Portugal and Canada and in the occupation of France. 

In 1825, he was sent to New South Wales as Lieutenant-Governor, holding the post until 1827. 

Stewart married Sylvia Anne ( Wolfe), and was survived by three daughters and one son, James Horne Stewart. After his post ended he went to India, where he became a major general. He returned in 1831 and was granted land near Bathurst. 

Stewart died there in 1854.

References

1769 births
1854 deaths
Lieutenant-Governors of New South Wales
Members of the New South Wales Legislative Council
19th-century Australian politicians

Further reading

Theo Barker, Stewart, William (1769–1854), Australian Dictionary of Biography volume 2. National Centre of Biography, Australian National University, published first in hardcopy 1967.

Gordon Neil Stewart, The Claimant: a story of Australia, Scotland and England. (Harry Stewart, Canberra, 2019)  . 

Jane Cooper, Mrs. Molesworth: a biography. (Pratts Folly Press, Crowborough, 2002). .